The term AA-6 or AA6 may refer to:

 Bisnovat R-40, a Soviet long-range air-to-air missile whose NATO reporting name is the AA-6 'Acrid'
 Gardiner's designated symbol for a hieroglyph (Aa6)
 Ace Attorney 6